Henry Augustus Reeves (1832–1916) was a U.S. Representative from New York.

Henry Reeves may also refer to:

Henry E. Reeves, member of 6th Alaska State Legislature
Henry Ethelbert Sigismund Reeves, publisher of the Miami Times, the oldest and largest black-owned newspaper in the southeast of the United States. 
Henry Reeves Park in Overtown
Ellen Buckingham Mathews (1853–1920), writer also known as Mrs. Henry Reeves

See also
Harry Reeves (disambiguation)
Henry Reeve (disambiguation)